Hattfjelldal is a municipality in Nordland county, Norway. It is part of the Helgeland traditional region. The administrative centre of the municipality is the village of Hattfjelldal. Other villages include Grubben, Svenskvollen, and Varntresk. Hattfjelldal Airfield is located in the village of Hattfjelldal.

The  municipality is the 20th largest by area out of the 356 municipalities in Norway. Hattfjelldal is the 313th most populous municipality in Norway with a population of 1,273.

Hattfjelldal is one of the last strongholds for the seriously endangered Southern Sami language. It was also one of the municipalities in Norway involved in the Terra Securities scandal.

General information
The municipality of Hattfjelldal was established in 1862 when it was separated from the large municipality of Vefsn. The initial population of Hattfjelldal was 961. During the 1960s, there were many municipal mergers across Norway due to the work of the Schei Committee. On 1 January 1964, the part of Hattfjelldal on the north side of the lake Røssvatnet (population: 168) was transferred to the neighboring Hemnes Municipality.

Name
The municipality (originally a parish) is named after the old Hattfjelldalen farm (referred to as "Hatfieldalen" in 1723) where the first church was built. The name describes the valley (-dalen) below the mountain Hattfjellet. Hattfjellet takes its name from the hat-like shape.

Coat of arms
The coat of arms was granted on 24 October 1986. The official blazon is "Per fess argent and vert embattled with one battlement". This means the arms have a field (background) that is divided by a horizontal line that has a rectangular raised area. The field above the line has a tincture of argent which means it is commonly colored white, but if it is made out of metal, then silver is used. Below the line, the field is colored green. The arms were designed to mimic the local Hattfjellet mountain which rises above the terrain and can be seen for great distances. The mountain has steep sides with a rather flat plateau at the top, giving it a distinctive look. The design is a canting element since the name of the municipality means "hat mountain valley". The arms were designed by Arvid Sveen.

Churches
The Church of Norway has one parish within the municipality of Hattfjelldal. It is part of the Indre Helgeland prosti (deanery) in the Diocese of Sør-Hålogaland.

Geography

Hattfjelldal lies along the Swedish border in the southeastern part of Nordland county. The lake Røssvatnet lies on the border between Hattfjelldal and Hemnes, and it serves as a reservoir. It has been the site of human occupation since the Stone Age. Its area of  makes it the second largest lake in Norway by surface area.

Other lakes in the region include Daningen, Elsvatnet, Famnvatnet, Jengelvatnet, Kjerringvatnet, Krutvatnet, Ranseren, Simskardvatnet, and Unkervatnet. The large river Vefsna runs through the municipality.

Børgefjell National Park is partly located in the southern part of Hattfjelldal, as is Jetnamsklumpen, a prominent mountain. There is several nature reserves, such as Varnvassdalen with a varied topography and old growth forest of pine, birch and some spruce.

Government
All municipalities in Norway, including Hattfjelldal, are responsible for primary education (through 10th grade), outpatient health services, senior citizen services, unemployment and other social services, zoning, economic development, and municipal roads. The municipality is governed by a municipal council of elected representatives, which in turn elect a mayor.  The municipality falls under the Alstahaug District Court and the Hålogaland Court of Appeal.

Municipal council
The municipal council of Hattfjelldal is made up of 11 representatives that are elected to four year terms. The party breakdown of the council is as follows:

Notable people
 Anders K. Orvin (1889–1980) a Norwegian geologist and explorer
 Anna Jacobsen (1924–2004), champion of Southern Sami language and culture
 Karl Ingebrigtsen (born 1935) a Norwegian politician

References

External links
Municipal fact sheet from Statistics Norway 

 
Municipalities of Nordland
Valleys of Nordland
1862 establishments in Norway